Sach Pass is a  mountain pass in Chamba District, Himachal Pradesh, India on the Pir Panjal range of the Himalayas. It connects the Chamba valley with the Pangi valleys of Himachal Pradesh, India. There is a helipad on the ascent towards Sach pass from Bairagarh of Himachal Pradesh.

Overview 
The pass is open from June or early July to mid October. The road is narrow and unmetalled. It is the gateway to the Pangi Valley. It is the shortest and toughest route from Chamba to the Killar (170 km) and was newly constructed. Pangi is also accessible all the year round from Paddar valley (Jammu & Kashmir) but it is a longer route as one has to take the Chamba to Baderwah or Udhampur road in Jammu &Kashmir.

History 
1998 Chamba massacre also took place at Satrundi & Kalaban when 35 Hindus and some buddhist, mostly labourers, were shot down by terrorists, and 11 were injured. They were working on the Saach Pass road. There was a lack of security but now whole area is under surveillance and is now getting more popular among trekkers and tourists.

Importance 
It is the shortest route to Killar. So this road can be used by Indian Army.

Distances 
Sach pass can be reached from three directions, via Pathankot-Dalhousie road, Manali-Udaipur road, and Udhampur/Anantnag-Kishtwar-Paddar-Pangi road. The first is the shortest, more treacherous, and most popular route, given that the other routes are very long in comparison.

The distance of Sach Pass from a few major places on all three routes are below.

Gallery

See also
Borasu pass
Rupin Pass
Takling La (Pass)
Pin Parvati Pass

References

External links 

 Sach Pass Scooter Ride travelogue
 Free Souls Rider Sach Pass Ride
 Best time to visit Sach Pass

Mountain passes of the Himalayas
Mountain passes of Himachal Pradesh
Geography of Chamba district